Benjaminia is a monotypic genus of flowering plants belonging to the family Plantaginaceae. It only contains one known species, Benjaminia reflexa .

Its native range is parts of Central and Tropical America, and is found in Belize, Bolivia, Brazil, Colombia, Costa Rica, Cuba, French Guiana, Guatemala, Guyana, Honduras, Mexico Gulf, southeastern Mexico, Nicaragua, Panamá, Suriname, Trinidad and Tobago and Venezuela.

It is an aquatic species from freshwater marshes, and coastal lagoons and freshwater lagoons.

The genus name of Benjaminia is in honour of Ludwig Benjamin (1825–48) was a German botanist who contributed to Carl Friedrich Philipp von Martius' Flora Brasiliensis. The Latin specific epithet of reflexa is dervided from reflecto meanng bent backwards or reflexed.
The genus was first described and published in C.F.P.von Martius & auct. suc. (eds.), Fl. Bras. Vol.10 on page 255 in 1847.
The species was then published in Ann. Missouri Bot. Gard. Vol.66 on page 194 in 1979.

The genus is recognized by the United States Department of Agriculture and the Agricultural Research Service, but they do not list any known species.

References

Plantaginaceae
Plants described in 1846
Flora of Veracruz
Flora of Southeastern Mexico
Flora of Central America
Flora of the Caribbean
Flora of northern South America
Flora of Colombia
Flora of Brazil
Flora without expected TNC conservation status